Nataša Vučković is a Serbian politician. She served in the National Assembly of Serbia from 2007 to 2020 as a member of the Democratic Party (Demokratska stranka, DS). She left the DS in September 2020 and is no longer active with any political party.

Early life, family, and private career
Vučković was born in Zagreb, in what was then the Socialist Republic of Croatia in the Socialist Federal Republic of Yugoslavia. She graduated from the University of Belgrade Faculty of Law in 1990 and has been a lawyer since 1994. She is also a graduate of the European University Centre (2006) with a focus on European Union law.

Vučković was a founder of Serbia's Center for Democracy Foundation in 1994 and has been its secretary-general since that time. In April 2012, she represented the organization in supporting the Dignity at Work for Everyone project, pledging to fight for new jobs in Serbia while adhering to the European Union's standards on the rights of workers. She lives in Belgrade.

Her father, Slobodan Vučković, was a prominent member of Serbia's opposition in the 1990s and also served in the national assembly during this time.

Politician

Early years (1990–2007)
Vučković joined the DS on its formation in 1990. From 1991 to 1994, she was secretary of the party's presidency and secretary for international cooperation. After a party split in 1996, she joined the breakaway Democratic Centre (Demokratski centar, DC) under the leadership of Dragoljub Mićunović.

In 2000, the DC participated in the Democratic Opposition of Serbia (Demokratska opozicija Srbije, DOS), a broad and ideologically diverse coalition of parties opposed to Slobodan Milošević's authoritarian rule. The DOS won the 2000 Yugoslavian general election (which removed Milošević from power) and the subsequent 2000 Serbian parliamentary election, and the DC participated in government at both the federal and republic levels. In 2001, Vučković became an advisor on international cooperation to the speaker of the parliament of the Federal Republic of Yugoslavia. She continued in this role after Yugoslavia was reconstituted as the State Union of Serbia and Montenegro in early 2003, although her term concluded later in the same year.

The Democratic Centre had effected a partial reconciliation with the DS by 2003 and contested that year's parliamentary election on the DS's electoral list. Vučković was given the 189th position; the list won thirty-seven mandates, and she was not selected for her party's assembly delegation. (From 2000 to 2011, mandates in Serbian parliamentary elections were awarded to sponsoring parties or coalitions rather than individual candidates, and it was common practice for the mandates to be distributed out of numerical order. Vučković could have been assigned a seat despite her low position on the list, though ultimately she was not.)

The Democratic Centre merged back into the DS in 2004, and Vučković became a member of the DS's executive board in the same year.

Parliamentarian (2007–20)

Government supporter (2007–12)
Vučković received the fifty-first position on the DS's electoral list in the 2007 Serbian parliamentary election. The list won sixty-four seats, and on this occasion she was awarded a mandate. The DS formed an unstable coalition government after the election with the rival Democratic Party of Serbia (Demokratska stranka Srbije, DSS) and G17 Plus, and Vučković served as a supporter of the administration. During her first term, she was a member of the committee on foreign affairs, the committee on development and international economic relations, and the committee on European integration.

The DS–DSS coalition fell apart in early 2008, and another parliamentary election was called for May of that year. Vučković was given the thirty-second position on the DS's For a European Serbia (Za evropsku Srbiju, ZES) coalition list and was awarded a mandate for a second term when the list won 102 out of 250 seats. The overall results of the election were inconclusive, but For a European Serbia ultimately formed a new government with the Socialist Party of Serbia (Socijalistička partija Srbije, SPS), and Vučković continued to serve with the government's parliamentary majority. She remained a member of the foreign affairs committee and the European integration committee; became a member of the administrative committee; and was a deputy member of the education committee, the committee on constitutional affairs, and the committee on defence and security.

She chaired Serbia's parliamentary friendship group with France in this sitting of the assembly and oversaw a meeting of French and Serbian parliamentarians in Belgrade in April 2010. She remarked that the visit was an opportunity for Serbian parliamentarians to review their country's priorities, one of the most important of which was joining the European Union. Vučković was also a member of Serbia's delegation to the parliamentary assembly of the Francophonie and a member of the friendship groups with the Netherlands and Spain.

Opposition member (2012–20)
Serbia's electoral system was reformed in 2011, such that parliamentary mandates were awarded in numerical order to candidates on successful lists. Vučković received the twenty-seventh position on the DS's Choice for a Better Life list in the 2012 parliamentary election and was re-elected when the list won sixty-seven mandates. The Serbian Progressive Party (Srpska napredna stranka, SNS) and the Socialist Party formed a new coalition government after the election, and the DS moved into opposition. Vučković chaired the European integration committee in this sitting of parliament. She also continued to serve on the foreign affairs committee and was a member of the friendship groups with France, Germany, and the United States of America.

After the 2012 election, the DS became divided between supporters of former Serbian president Boris Tadić and supporters of Dragan Đilas (who replaced Tadić as leader in November 2012). Vučković was aligned with Tadić; in a bid to ensure party unity, she was chosen as a party vice-president at the conference that elected Đilas as leader. In June 2013, she supported Dragan Šutanovac's bid for the leadership of the DS in Belgrade; rival candidate Balša Božović was instead chosen for the position. Tadić left the DS in early 2014 to create a breakaway group called the New Democratic Party (Nova demokratska stranka, NDS). Vučković chose to remain in the DS. The NDS was later renamed as the Social Democratic Party (Socijaldemokratska stranka, SDS).

Vučković was promoted to the third position on the DS's list in the 2014 parliamentary election and was re-elected without difficulty even as the list fell to only nineteen seats. Bojan Pajtić replaced Đilas as party leader later in the year, and Vučković was again chosen as a party vice-president. During her fourth assembly term, she was a member of the committee on administrative, budgetary, mandate, and immunity issues; a member of the committee on European integration; a deputy member of the committee on constitutional affairs and legislation; the leader of Serbia's delegation to the assembly of the Francophonie; the leader of Serbia's friendship group with France; and a member of the friendship groups with Italy, Norway, and the United States.

She again received the third position on the DS's list in the 2016 parliamentary election and was elected to a fifth assembly term when the list won sixteen mandates. She considered running for the DS leadership after the election but ultimately did not do so.  In September 2016, she was narrowly defeated in a bid for re-election as a party vice-president. In the 2017 Serbian presidential election, Vučković was an early supporter of Saša Janković's candidacy; Janković was ultimately endorsed by the DS and finished a distant second against Aleksandar Vučić of the Progressive Party.

During the 2016–20 parliament, Vučković was a member of the foreign affairs committee and the European integration committee; a deputy member of the committee on constitutional and legislature issues; a deputy member of the committee on the judiciary, public administration, and local self-government; a deputy member of the committee on labour, social issues, social inclusion, and poverty reduction; a member of Serbia's delegation to the Parliamentary Assembly of the Mediterranean; once again the head of Serbia's friendship group with France; and a member of the friendship groups with Croatia, Germany, Poland, Slovenia, Sweden, the United Kingdom, and the United States.

Opposition to election boycott and departure from the DS (2019–20)
Several opposition parties, including the Democratic Party, began boycotting of the national assembly in early 2019, against the backdrop of significant protests against Serbia's government. The party later joined an opposition boycott of the 2020 Serbian parliamentary election. Some DS politicians who were against the boycott (most notably Gordana Čomić) left the party to contest the election on the list of the United Democratic Serbia (Ujedinjena demokratska Srbija, UDS) alliance. Vučković remained with the DS but indicated her personal disagreement with the boycott and her support for Serbia 21, one of the main parties in the UDS. After the election, she reiterated her view that the boycott had been a mistake and expressed broader concerns about the DS's direction; she was particularly critical of its decision to co-operate with radical right-wing parties such as Dveri.

Vučković was one of several prominent members of the DS to be expelled from the party in September 2020. In April 2021, she remarked that the DS's decline was a co-ordinated process that had been taking place over a period of decades.

Council of Europe (2007–16)
Vučković served in Serbia's delegation to the Parliamentary Assembly of the Council of Europe (PACE) from 2007 to 2016. She was first appointed as a substitute delegate in 25 June 2007 and was promoted to full delegate status on 11 April 2011. In the PACE, she served in caucus with the Socialist Group.

Vučković held several prominent roles in the PACE, including vice-president of the assembly (2012–13); chair of the committee on rules of procedure, immunities, and institutional affairs (2013–15); and vice-chair of the committee on the election of judges to the European Court of Human Rights (2015–16). For her entire term in the PACE, she was a full member of the committee on legal affairs and human rights. She also served terms as vice-chair (2007–11) and first vice-chair (2012–16) of the Socialist Group.

In 2013, she submitted a report (adopted by the PACE) to deprive Ukrainian politician Serhiy Vlasenko of his mandate and recognize Andriy Shevchenko in his place. In April of the following year, she announced the PACE's plans to monitor the upcoming presidential election in Ukraine, indicating that it was important for delegates to visit as many regions of the country as possible.

In June 2015, Vučković was chosen as a special PACE rapporteur to Turkey, in which capacity she co-authored a report that was strongly critical of the functioning of democratic institutions in that country.

Local politics (2004–20)
Vučković has been an elected representative at the city and municipal levels in Belgrade. She received the seventeenth position on the DS list for the City Assembly of Belgrade in the 2004 Serbian local elections and was awarded a mandate when the list won a plurality victory with thirty-four out of ninety seats. Toward the end of her term in the city assembly, she took part in Serbia's delegation to the Chamber of Regions in the Council of Europe's Congress of Local and Regional Authorities.

She did not seek re-election at the city level in the 2008 local elections but instead appeared on the DS's list in Savski Venac, one of Belgrade's seventeen constituent municipalities, and was given a mandate after the list won a plurality victory. She was re-elected in 2012 and 2016. She also ran for the city assembly in the 2018 Belgrade City Assembly election, appearing in the twelfth position on a combined Democratic Party–Social Democratic Party list. On this occasion, the list did not cross the electoral threshold to win representation in the assembly. Vučković did not seek re-election in Savski Venac in 2020.

References

1967 births
Living people
Politicians from Zagreb
Politicians from Belgrade
21st-century Serbian women politicians
21st-century Serbian politicians
Members of the National Assembly (Serbia)
Members of the City Assembly of Belgrade
Members of the Parliamentary Assembly of the Council of Europe
Members of the Parliamentary Assembly of the Mediterranean
Members of the Parliamentary Assembly of the Francophonie
Members of the Chamber of Regions in the Congress of Local and Regional Authorities of the Council of Europe
Democratic Party (Serbia) politicians
Democratic Centre (Serbia) politicians
Socialist Group politicians
Women members of the National Assembly (Serbia)